Philippe Renaud (born 23 November 1962) is a French sprint canoeist who competed during the 1980s. Competing in two Summer Olympics, he won a bronze in the C-2 500 m event at Seoul in 1988.

Renaud also won three medals at the ICF Canoe Sprint World Championships with a silver (C-4 500 m: 1991) and two bronzes (C-2 500 m and C-4 500 m: both 1989).

His father, Marcel won a silver in the C-2 10000 m event at Melbourne in 1956. His brother, Eric, won a bronze in the C-2 1000 m event at Los Angeles in 1984. A great-uncle, also named Marcel, finished fourth in the 4000 m team pursuit cycling event at Paris in 1924.

References
DatabaseOlympics.com profile

Sports-reference.com profile
Wallechinsky, David and Jaime Loucky (2008). "Canoeing: Men's Canadian Pairs 500 Meters". In The Complete Book of the Olympics: 2008 Edition. London: Aurum Press Limited. p. 481.

1962 births
Canoeists at the 1984 Summer Olympics
Canoeists at the 1988 Summer Olympics
French male canoeists
Living people
Olympic canoeists of France
Olympic bronze medalists for France
Olympic medalists in canoeing
ICF Canoe Sprint World Championships medalists in Canadian
Medalists at the 1988 Summer Olympics